Yip is a nickname of:

 Harry Yip Foster (1907–1978), Canadian National Hockey League player
 Edgar Yipsel Yip Harburg (1896–1981), American song lyricist
 Frank Owen (baseball) (1879–1942), American Major League Baseball pitcher
 Frank Yip Owens (1886–1958), Canadian Major League Baseball catcher
 John Yip Radley (1908–1963), Canadian National Hockey League player

Lists of people by nickname